The 1940 North Dakota Fighting Sioux football team, also known as the Nodaks, was an American football team that represented the University of North Dakota in the North Central Conference (NCC) during the 1940 college football season. In its 12th year under head coach Charles A. West, the team compiled a 5–4 record (4–1 against NCC opponents), finished in second place out of seven teams in the NCC, and was outscored by a total of 110 to 102.

Schedule

References

North Dakota
North Dakota Fighting Hawks football seasons
North Dakota Fighting Sioux football